Lisa Bradley (born 1951 in Columbus, Ohio) is an American artist who has been exhibiting for over forty years at galleries and museums in New York City, Washington, D.C., Los Angeles, San Francisco, Chicago, Boston, Paris, Helsinki, Tokyo, Brussels and Dakar.

Career 
Her paintings are in the collections of the Minneapolis Institute of Arts, Delaware Art Museum, Columbus Museum of Art, National Museum of Women in the Arts, Pennsylvania Academy of the Fine Arts, Farnsworth Art Museum, Frederick R. Weisman Art Museum and New Orleans Museum of Art.

Her works have been reviewed by critics in art publications including Artforum, D’Art International, Arts Magazine and the Helsingin Sanomat.

The American artist and art dealer Betty Parsons was a mentor in Bradley's early career. The collectors The late Herbert Vogel and Dorothy Vogel have been mentors of her work, and Bradley’s paintings and drawings from the Vogel collection are currently being exhibited in museums in the United States as part of the Vogel 50/50 collaboration sponsored by the National Gallery of Art.

Currently living and working in New York, where she has been based since the late 1970s, Bradley is known for the dynamic interaction of line, plane and space in her paintings. Having developed an individualized formal vocabulary, the artist achieves an expression of simultaneous movement and stillness. Her painting creates a feeling of suspended time or, as an art critic, Carter Ratcliff commented, "a pause between the pulses of some vast and luminous energy." A reproduction of her work appears in the seminal art history text, The Art of Seeing, 3rd through 6th editions, published by Prentice Hall.

Sources

External links 
Official Website
Lisa Bradley Catalogue on artnet
HERB & DOROTHY 50X50 on IMDb
Vogel 50x50: Lisa Bradley
Lisa Bradley Show at Hollis Taggart Galleries
"Hard to Explain": Lisa Bradley's Mysterious Abstractions by Jonathan Goodman, artcritical

1951 births
Living people
20th-century American women artists
21st-century American women artists
American women painters
Artists from Columbus, Ohio
Painters from Ohio